Sterren Dansen Op Het IJs is a Dutch spin-off of British show Dancing on Ice.  The first four seasons were hosted by singer(s) Gerard Joling and Nance Coolen. Tess Milne replaced the latter for the fifth season.

Jury
 Peter Moormann
 Jayne Hamelink
 Wil Visser
 Marc Forno 
 Katarina Witt (Only in the first show and final season 1)

Season 1

Contestants
 Hein Vergeer (Former World Champion speed skating) Winner
 Jody Bernal (Singer) 2nd
 Maud Mulder (Runner-up Idols Netherlands Season 2) 3rd
 Annamarie Thomas (Former speed skater) 4th
 Ellemieke Vermolen (Presenter) 5th
 Laura Vlasblom (Singer) 6th
 Mari van de Ven (Stylist) 7th
 Klaas Wilting (Former policeman) 8th
 Marga Scheide (Member of girl group Luv') 9th
 Leontien van Moorsel (Former Olympic and World-Champion cyclist) 10th
 Joao Varela (Former Dutch parliament member) 11th

Season 2

Contestants

 Sita Vermeulen (Singer) Winner
 Geert Hoes (Actor) 2nd
 Thomas Berge (Singer) 3rd
 Jasmine Sendar (Actress) 4th
 Petra Kagchelland (Actress) 5th
 Corry Konings (Singer) 6th
 Arend Langeberg (Presenter) 7th
 Jeroen Blijlevens (Former professional cyclist) 8th
 Gallyon van Wessem (Presenter) 9th
 Dries Roelvink (Singer) 10th
 Bas Westerweel (Presenter) 11th
 Elle van Rijn (Actress) 12th
 Kristina Bozilovic (Presenter) 13th

Wildcard Show

Contestants
 Petra Kagchelland (Actress) Wildcard Winner
 Patty Brard (TV presenter / Member of girl group Luv') 
 Rob Geus (Presenter)
 Lola Brood (Daughter of Herman Brood)
 Mike Staring (Presenter)

External links
  

Dutch reality television series
Figure skating on television
SBS6 original programming